Kimm is a surname. Notable people with the surname include:

Bruce Kimm (born 1951), American baseball player, manager and coach
Cory Kimm (born 1974), Canadian radio personality
Fiona Kimm, English opera singer

See also
Polly Carver-Kimm, American television personality
KIMM (disambiguation)
Kim (disambiguation)